Three Hands is the title of a recording by Canadian guitarist Don Ross, released in 1992. It is his last for Duke Street Records after being signed to a contract with Columbia/Sony Canada.

Track listing

 "Spirit Wars" (Geoff Bartley)
 "Hoover the Musical Dog"
 "Island of Women"
 "A Child Must Grow"
 "3 Hands"
 "Run, Don't Walk"
 "Sugar"
 "Kehewin"
 "Big Buck"
 "Everybody Lies" (Leo Kottke)
 "39 Weeks"
 "Leger de Main"

Personnel
Don Ross – guitar, vocals

Don Ross (guitarist) albums
1992 albums
Duke Street Records albums